Samuel Mason Graffen  (1845 - November 18, 1883) was a manager in Major League Baseball. He managed the St. Louis Brown Stockings of the National League for part of the 1876 season.

His career managerial record was 39-17 in 56 games.

External links
Baseball Reference Managerial record

1845 births
1883 deaths
St. Louis Brown Stockings managers
Sportspeople from Philadelphia